Annie Martin (born 7 September 1981) is a Canadian beach volleyball player. She has represented her country at the 2004 and 2012 Summer Olympics. Her current playing partner is Marie-Andrée Lessard.

University career
Martin played university volleyball for the Sherbrooke Vert et Or for five seasons from 2000 to 2005. She won RSEQ conference championships with the Vert et Or in 2002 and 2005 and won national championships with the team in 2003 and 2005.

Career
Martin was inspired to compete in beach volleyball after seeing Mark Heese and John Child compete for Canada at the 1996 Summer Olympics. She has won five Canadian titles, in 2002, 2003, 2004, 2006 and in 2009.

Martin and her partner, Guylaine Dumont, tied for fifth in the women's beach volleyball event at the 2004 Summer Olympics, after losing to the American pair of Kerri Walsh and Misty May in the quarterfinals.

Martin qualified once more for the Olympics at the 2012 Summer Games, teaming with Marie-Andrée Lessard, after the pair defeated Liz Maloney and Heather Bansley in a match to decide the Canadian representatives. Martin and Lessard had previously won the Canadian team a place at the women's beach volleyball tournament by winning the Continental Cup Games qualifying tournament. Prior to the 2012 Games, Martin was the only active Canadian beach volleyball athlete who had competed in a previous Olympics. Ahead of the tournament, the duo felt positive about the teams they had been drawn against in the preliminary group stage. Martin and Lessard lost their first match against the British team of Zara Dampney and Shauna Mullin after winning the first set 21–14, but then lost the second 21–14 and the third by 15–13. The Canadian duo lost their second match by a similar scoreline, 2–1 in sets, against the Russian team of Ekaterina Khomyakova and Evgenia Ukolova.

Honours
In 2012, Martin was awarded the Queen Elizabeth II Diamond Jubilee Medal.

Personal life
Annie Martin was born in Lachine, Quebec, and is married to Vincent Larivee. Martin speaks both English and French, and was educated at the Université de Sherbrooke.

References

External links
 
 
 
 
 
 

1981 births
Living people
Beach volleyball players at the 2004 Summer Olympics
Beach volleyball players at the 2012 Summer Olympics
Canadian women's beach volleyball players
French Quebecers
Olympic beach volleyball players of Canada
People from Lachine, Quebec
Sportspeople from Montreal
Sportspeople from Sherbrooke
Université de Sherbrooke alumni
Sherbrooke Vert et Or volleyball players